South Bergish or Upper Bergish is a group of German dialects of the Bergisches Land region East of the Rhine and approximately south of the Wupper and north of the Sieg. These dialects are part of the Ripuarian group and thus are also called East Ripuarian.  Ripuarian dialects are also spoken west of the Rhine up to the German border, and in some small areas next to the respective borders in Belgium and in the Netherlands. Ripuarian Bergish dialects belong to the Middle German group, and thus are varieties of High German, where they belong to the northmost ones. In the North, they border to the Bergish dialects, which are part of the Low Franconian group like Dutch. Some of South Bergish is transitional with East Bergish.

In popular view, rather than scientific, South Bergish dialects are often referred to as Bergish by locals, or as Rhinelandic by outsiders.

See also
 Meuse-Rhenish
 Rheinischer Fächer (in the German Wikipedia)

Literature 
 Georg Wenker: Das rheinische Platt. 1877.
 Das rheinische Platt, (Sammlung deutsche Dialektgeographie Heft 8), Marburg, 1915.
 Georg Cornelissen, Peter Honnen, Fritz Langensiepen (Hrsg.): Das rheinische Platt. Eine Bestandsaufnahme. Handbuch der rheinischen Mundarten Teil 1: Texte. Rheinland-Verlag, Köln. 1989. 
 Maria Loiuse Denst: Olper Platt - Bergisches Mundart-Wörterbuch für Kürten-Olpe und Umgebung. Schriftenreihe des Bergischen Geschichtsvereins Abt. Rhein-Berg e. V. Band 29. Bergisch Gladbach 1999. 
 Hans Bruchhausen und Heinz Feldhoff: Us Platt kalle un verstonn - Mundartwörterbuch Lützenkirchen-Quettingen. Bergisch Gladbach 2005. 
 Leo Lammert und Paul Schmidt: Neunkirchen-Seelscheider Sprachschatz, herausgegeben vom Heimat- und Geschichtsverein Neunkirchen-Seelscheid 2006. (ca. 7300 Wörter)
 Theodor Branscheid (Hrsg): Oberbergische Sprachproben. Mundartliches aus Eckenhagen und Nachbarschaft. Band 1, Eckenhagen, 1927.
 Werner Heinrichs: Bergisch Platt - Versuch einer Bestandsaufnahme, Selbstverlag, Burscheid, 1978
 Manfred Konrads: Wörter und Sachen im Wildenburger Ländchen, Rheinland-Verlag, Köln, 1981
 Helmut Fischer: Wörterbuch der unteren Sieg. Rheinische Mundarten. Beiträge zur Volkssprache aus den rheinischen Landschaften Band 4. Rheinland Verlag, Köln, 1985. 

Languages of Germany
Central German languages
German dialects
Ripuarian language
North Rhine-Westphalia